Atwater is a village in the Canadian province of Saskatchewan within the Rural Municipality of Fertile Belt No. 183 and Census Division No. 5. The village is approximately 45 km southeast of the City of Melville on Highway 629.

History 
Atwater incorporated as a village on August 12, 1910.

Demographics 

Climate

See also

 List of communities in Saskatchewan
 Villages of Saskatchewan

References

Villages in Saskatchewan
Fertile Belt No. 183, Saskatchewan
Division No. 5, Saskatchewan